Lee Yi-woo (born 18 February 1941) is a South Korean former footballer who competed in the 1964 Summer Olympics.

References

External links
 

1941 births
Living people
South Korean footballers
Olympic footballers of South Korea
Footballers at the 1964 Summer Olympics
Footballers from Seoul
Association football forwards
South Korea international footballers
South Korea women's national football team managers